Baroness Gertrud von Puttkamer (Gertrud Freifrau von Puttkamer in German; born Gertrud Günther, 4 April 1881 – 27 or 30 September 1944), also known by her pen name Marie-Madeleine, was a German writer of lesbian-themed erotic literature and homoerotic poetry. Her first book, Auf Kypros, sold over one million copies during her lifetime.

Life 
Gertrud Günther was born on 4 April 1881 in Eydtkuhnen, East Prussia in the Kingdom of Prussia to Jewish parents. Her father was Karl Günther, a merchant, and her mother was Emmy Siemssen, a housewife. She grew up within Eydtkuhnen's middle class Jewish community. In 1900, at the age of nineteen, she married Baron Heinrich Georg Ludwig von Puttkamer, a member of the Pomeranian nobility who was 35 years her senior. Upon her marriage, Baroness von Puttkamer moved into a villa with her husband in Grunewald, Berlin and frequently traveled to Vienna, Paris, Nice, and Monte Carlo where she socialized with Hollywood actors, European royalty and nobility, artists, and writers and began using morphine recreationally. Her husband's death in 1914 led to her morphine addiction.

Writing 
In 1900, von Puttkamer published her first book of poetry under the pen-name Marie-Madeleine, titled Auf Kypros, which was a collection of lesbian-themed erotic verses. Auf Kypros became a best-seller throughout the German Empire, particularly in high society circles. At the time, her work was seen as contrary to societal standards on morality and was even considered pornographic. Throughout the next fourteen years, von Puttkamer published 28 more books, including poetry, short stories, plays and novels. By 1910, her writings were not only centered on lesbian erotic love but also on the use of morphine. By the end of her life, von Puttkamer had written over 46 works.

List of works 
A list of some of von Puttkamer's known works include:

 Auf Kypros (1900)
 Das Bisschen Liebe (1900)
 Die drei Nächte (1901)
 An der Liebe Narrenseil (1902)
 Die Indische Felsentaube (1902)
 Aus faulem Holze (1902)
 Im Spielerparadies: Momentphotographien aus Monte Carlo (1903)
 Frivol: Aus dem Leben eines Pferdes (1903)
 Krabben (1903)
 Arme Ritter! (1904)
 In Seligkeit und Sünden (1905)
 Das Bißchen Liebe (1906)
 Der Rote Champion (1906)
 Die Kleider der Herzogin (1906)
 Die letzte Hürde (1907)
 Die Kusine (1908)
 Die Wegweiserin (1908)
 Prinz Christian (1909)
 Die Stelle, wo sie sterblich sind ... (1909)
 Brennende Liebe (1910)
 Katzen (1910)
 Die heiligsten Güter (1911)
 Die rote Rose Leidenschaft (1912)
 Pantherkätzchen (1913)
 Der süße Rausch (1916)
 Taumel (1920)
 Ausgewählte Werke (1924)
 Die Töchter des Prometheus (1926)
 Ihr schlechter Ruf (1928)

Later life and death 
During the Third Reich, von Puttkamer's identity was discovered by the Nazis. In 1932, her writings were condemned as degenerate and ordered to be burned. In 1943, she was committed to a sanatorium in Katzenelnbogen under the pretense of treating her morphine addiction. She died on 27 or 30 September 1944 while under the care of Nazi doctors.

Legacy 
In 2016, Baroness von Puttkamer's rediscovered works were translated into English and compiled into the book Priestess of Morphine: The Lost Writings of Marie-Madeleine in the Time of Nazis by Ronald K. Siegel.

Citations

References 

 

1881 births
1944 deaths
20th-century German women writers
20th-century German poets
20th-century German novelists
Women erotica writers
German erotica writers
German women poets
German women novelists
German baronesses
German Jews who died in the Holocaust
Jewish women writers
German LGBT poets
Drug-related deaths in Germany
People killed by Nazi Germany
People from East Prussia
Gertrud
LGBT Jews
Women in World War II